Bonguk geom (Korean 본국검 "national sword", also  singeom  신검 "Silla sword") in Joseon era Korean martial arts (17th to 18th centuries) referred both to a type of sword and a style of swordsmanship.

The term was introduced in the Muyesinbo of 1759, and the system was supposedly a creation of Crown Prince Sado. It contrasts with Jedok geom, or "admiral sword", a system supposedly introduced by the Chinese admiral Li Rusong during the 16th-century Imjin War (the "national sword" system is conspicuously absent from the older Muyejebo manual of 1610).
The Muyesinbo stresses the antiquity of this "national" Korean system by including the narrative of a Silla "Flower Youth" called Hwangchang, who killed Baekje's king while performing a sword dance, known as Geommu, at the court. 

The historical swords of the Silla period would have been double-edged and comparable to those of the Eastern Han dynastic period (see also Hwandudaedo). However, the Bonguk geom, as presented in the 18th-century manual, is historically based on a single-edged sword; a type common during that era.

In contemporary schools of Korean swordsmanship, the term bonguk geom is used to emphasize their "national" Korean character, without necessarily bearing a direct relation to the 18th-century system.

References

B.K. Choi, Sippalgi: Traditional Korean Martial Arts,  Ehwa University Press 2008

Traditional Korean weapons
Korean_swords